Robert "Trey" Alexander (born April 3, 1983 in Meridian, Mississippi) is an American soccer player, currently without a club.

Career

College and Amateur
Alexander grew up in Meridian, Mississippi and began his college career at Meridian Community College in 2001 before moving to Tyler Junior College in 2002.  In 2003, he transferred to Western Kentucky University.  He scored only once in 2003, but led the team with 11 goals his senior season.  In 2004, he was an assistant coach with WKU while he finished his degree.

During his college years Alexander also played with the Nashville Metros in the USL Premier Development League.

Professional
In March 2005, Alexander turned professional with the Charleston Battery of the USL First Division.  He played no games for Charleston that year. In 2006, he played for the Cincinnati Kings of the USL Second Division.  In March 2007, he signed with the Richmond Kickers of USL-2 before moving to the Wilmington Hammerheads for the 2008 season.

References

External links
 Wilmington Hammerheads bio

1982 births
Living people
Soccer players from Mississippi
Cincinnati Kings players
Charleston Battery players
Nashville Metros players
Richmond Kickers players
Tyler Apaches men's soccer players
Western Kentucky Hilltoppers soccer players
USL League Two players
USL Second Division players
Sportspeople from Meridian, Mississippi
Wilmington Hammerheads FC players
Association football midfielders
American soccer players